The Sigatoka River is in the island of Viti Levu in Fiji and has its source on the west side of Mount Victoria and flows for 120 kilometers to the coast between the central and western ranges. It is the chief means of transportation with some parts of the interior of the island.

The Sigatoka Sand Dunes are at the mouth of the river, and the Nadarivatu Dam was completed in 2012 in its headwaters.

References

Rivers of Viti Levu